A cartouche is a rounded oblong frame for royal names in Egyptian hieroglyphs. 

Cartouche may also refer to:

Cartouche (design), an oval or oblong design, typically edged with ornamental scrollwork
 Cartouche (cartography), a decorative emblem on a globe or map
 Louis Dominique Bourguignon (1693–1721), French highwayman also known as Cartouche
 Cartouche, King of Paris (also known as Cartouche), a 1950 French film about him
 Cartouche (film), a 1962 French film about him
 Cartouche (group), a Eurodance act
 "Cartouche", a 2003 song by Blackmore's Night from Ghost of a Rose
 "Cartouche", a season 5 episode of Endeavour

See also 
 Cartucho, a 1931 novel by Nellie Campobello
 Cartouche box or ammunition box
 Cartridge (disambiguation)